Northwest High School is a secondary school in Grand Island, Nebraska, United States, and is part of the Northwest Public Schools district. It was founded in 1963. It is accredited by AdvancED. The school serves students in grades nine through twelve. Enrollment at the high school was 719 as of December 2016.

Northwest High School colors are black and gold. The mascot is a Viking, and pupils are referred to as Northwest Vikings.

Northwest High School is a member of the Nebraska School Activities Association (NSAA). They compete in District IV and Central West conference.

History 
Northwest High School was formed in response to overcrowding at Grand Island Senior High School. The overcrowding even with just local students was so severe that the Grand Island school board demanded that 16 rural school districts in Hall and Merrick counties that, at the time, sent their high school students there consolidate with it or find somewhere else to educate their high school-aged students. As a consolidation would have resulted in tax increases for rural property owners, the school districts instead formed a Class VI school district—the Nebraska term for a union school district that only educated high school students, with a separate school board—and passed a $793,000 bond issue in order to erect a new facility. The new school was forecast to immediately serve 200 students. Opened as Grand Island Class VI High School in August 1963, the name was changed that September to Northwest High School upon a student vote.

In 2019 the show choir director for the past few years, David Shack got arrested for embezzling money from the show choir's account. Over 200,000 dollars was the estimated amount funneled out of the account between 2014 and 2019. He was sentenced to 90 days in jail and has to pay back 150,000 of the 200,000 he stole.

In 2020 an English teacher working at Northwest, Brian Mohr and a student, Max Rookstool, got arrested for possession of child pornography. Rookstool also had additional charges:
Two counts of Human trafficking,
Two counts of Human trafficking of a minor,
First-degree sexual assault,
11 counts of “Visual depiction of sexually explicit conduct”,
Unlawful distribution of images or videos of another person's intimate area. 
Mohr was charged with 11 counts of possession of child pornography. They both have sentences in federal prison and will be registered as sex offenders.

In 2022, the school's student newspaper, the Viking Saga, was shut down by the school administration because of the paper's coverage of LGBTQ topics and the refusal by transgender staff to use their birthnames on article bylines.

Notable alumni
Rick Allen, sportscaster

References

External links
 School webpage at district website

Educational institutions established in 1963
Grand Island, Nebraska
Public high schools in Nebraska
Schools in Hall County, Nebraska
1963 establishments in Nebraska